The Valencia orange is a sweet orange cultivar named after the famed oranges in València, Spain. It was first hybridized by pioneer American agronomist and land developer William Wolfskill in the mid-19th century on his farm in Santa Ana, southern California, United States, North America.

History 

William Wolfskill (1798–1866) was an American born in Kentucky and reared in Missouri. He became a Mexican citizen in the 1820s, when in his 20s, while working in Santa Fe, New Mexico as a fur trapper, and then migrating to California, which was still part of Mexico at that time. He was given a land grant as a naturalized Mexican citizen under Mexican government rules. He cultivated numerous vineyards and grape varietals, and was the largest wine producer in the region. He continued to buy land, and later had sheep ranches, as well as developing extensive citrus orchards. He hybridized the Valencia orange, a sweet orange, naming it for València, Spain, which has a reputation for its sweet orange trees.

Before his death in 1866, Wolfskill sold his patented Valencia hybrid to the Irvine Ranch owners, who planted nearly half their lands to its cultivation. The success of this crop in Southern California led to the naming of Valencia, California. It became the most popular juice orange in the United States.

In the mid 20th century, Florida botanist Lena B. Smithers Hughes introduced major improvements to the Valencia orange, developing virus-free strains for budwood production.  These were so successful that, by 1983, the Hughes Valencia bud line made up some 60 percent of all Valencia oranges propagated for cultivation in Florida.

In 1988, Merleen Smith, a woman in Ventura County, California, contacted her local farm advisor on the suspicion that her neighbor was poisoning her tree. Investigators found that it was a pigmented bud sport of a conventional Valencia orange tree. The orange cultivar 'Smith Red Valencia' (with red insides) now bears her name.

Description 
Primarily grown for processing and orange juice production, Valencia oranges have seeds, varying in number from zero to nine per fruit. Its excellent taste and internal color make it desirable for the fresh fruit markets, too. After bloom, it usually carries two crops on the tree, the old and the new. The commercial harvest season in Florida runs from March to June. Worldwide, Valencia oranges are prized as the only variety of orange in season during summer. Furthermore, Valencia oranges bring benefits because of the vitamin C and flavonoids contained.

In 2012, the genome of the orange was sequenced, and was found to have 29,445 protein-coding genes. It was also found that the sweet orange originated from a backcross hybrid between pummelo and mandarin orange.

The Valencia orange undergoes nucellar embryony in both fertilized and unfertilized conditions of the ovule.

See also 
 California Citrus State Historic Park
 Eliza Tibbets
 Laraha
 Mother Orange Tree
 Midknight Valencia Orange

References

External links
 HOME FRUIT PRODUCTION-ORANGES at Texas Cooperative Extension Texas A&M Horticulture program
 Sweet Oranges (including Valencia Oranges: Campbell Valencia orange, Cutter Valencia orange, Delta Valencia orange, Midknight Valencia orange, Olinda Valencia orange  at University of California Riverside Citrus Variety Collection
 Budget Plants: Valencia Orange Tree Information 

History of agriculture in the United States
History of Irvine, California
History of Orange County, California
History of the American West
Orange cultivars